The Acts of Parliament Numbering and Citation Act 1962 (10 & 11 Eliz 2 c 34) is an Act of the Parliament of the United Kingdom. It has never been amended. It was introduced because the existing system of citing Acts by session and chapter was considered "inconvenient".

Provisions

Section 1
This section provides that the chapter number of every Act of Parliament passed on or after 1 January 1963 is assigned by reference to the calendar year in which it has been passed, instead of by reference to the session of parliament in which it has been passed.

It further provides that any such Act may be cited accordingly in any Act, instrument or document.

Section 2
This section authorises the citation of this Act by a short title.

See also
Citation of United Kingdom legislation

References
Halsbury's Statutes. Fourth Edition. 2008 Reissue. Volume 41. Page 767.

Parliamentary debates
https://hansard.millbanksystems.com/written_answers/1961/nov/13/acts-of-parliament-numbering-and-citation
https://hansard.millbanksystems.com/lords/1961/dec/20/acts-of-parliament-number-ing-and
https://hansard.millbanksystems.com/lords/1962/jan/25/acts-of-parliament-number-ing-and
https://hansard.millbanksystems.com/commons/1962/feb/28/business-of-the-house
https://hansard.millbanksystems.com/commons/1962/feb/28/acts-of-parliament-numbering-and
https://hansard.millbanksystems.com/commons/1962/may/24/business-of-the-house#S5CV0660P0_19620524_HOC_217
https://hansard.millbanksystems.com/commons/1962/jun/28/business-of-the-house#S5CV0661P0_19620628_HOC_211
https://hansard.millbanksystems.com/commons/1962/jul/04/acts-of-parliament-numbering-and
https://hansard.millbanksystems.com/commons/1962/jul/19/royal-assent

External links
The Acts of Parliament Numbering and Citation Act 1962, from the National Archives.

United Kingdom Acts of Parliament 1962